Operation Dagger was a 2005 operation of the Iraq War. It took place in the southern Lake Tharthar region, in Al Anbar province and was conducted by the Regimental Combat Team-8, 2nd Marine Division.

The mission, which was to locate hidden weapons caches and enemy sanctuaries, was a failure. The mission followed Operation Spear, a similar operation.

References

Military operations of the Iraq War involving the United States
Military operations of the Iraq War involving Iraq
Military operations of the Iraq War in 2005
Iraqi insurgency (2003–2011)
United States Marine Corps in the Iraq War